Kairuku-Hiri District is a district of Central Province in Papua New Guinea. It is one of the four administrative districts that make up the province, and surrounds the national capital, Port Moresby.

Over half of the population of the Kairuku-Hiri district live in rural communities, and in many areas even basic services are lacking, and public infrastructure including roads, education, health and water supplies are in need of government attention.

Papua New Guinea's national government is working on two significant projects that are likely to commence in the Kairuku-Hiri district in the near future, being the Central City project at Bautama near Port Moresby, and the Liquefied Natural Gas (LNG) plant at Papa.

Some features of Kairuku-Hiri include the Hiri Moale Festival, the Kokoda Trail, Rouna Waterfall, Loloata Island Resort and the Mekeo Dancers.

Local-level government areas

 Hiri Rural
 Kairuku Rural
 Koiari Rural
 Mekeo Kuni Rural

Towns and major villages

See also
 Districts and LLGs of Papua New Guinea

References

External links
 Official site

Districts of Papua New Guinea